Karlstad Municipality is a municipality in Värmland County in west central Sweden. Its seat is located in the city of Karlstad.

The present municipality was established in 1971 when the former City of Karlstad was amalgamated with a number of surrounding rural municipalities.

Localities
Alster
Blombacka
Karlstad (seat)
Killstad
Molkom
Skattkärr
Skåre
Slängserud
Vallargärdet
Väse

Politics
Municipalities are responsible for government-mandated duties, and elections for the Municipal council are held every four years, parallel to the general elections.

The inhabitants of Karlstad have a tendency to vote close to the national results at the general elections, making it the generally accepted Bellwether town of Sweden.

Elections

Riksdag
These are the local results of the Riksdag elections since the 1972 municipality reform. The results of the Sweden Democrats were not published by SCB between 1988 and 1998 at a municipal level to the party's small nationwide size at the time. "Votes" denotes valid votes, whereas "Turnout" denotes also blank and invalid votes.

Blocs

This lists the relative strength of the socialist and centre-right blocs since 1973, but parties not elected to the Riksdag are inserted as "other", including the Sweden Democrats results from 1988 to 2006, but also the Christian Democrats pre-1991 and the Greens in 1982, 1985 and 1991. The sources are identical to the table above. The coalition or government mandate marked in bold formed the government after the election. New Democracy got elected in 1991 but are still listed as "other" due to the short lifespan of the party. "Elected" is the total number of percentage points from the municipality that went to parties who were elected to the Riksdag.

Notable natives
Bengt Alsterlind, TV host ("Hajk")
Zarah Leander, singer
Sven-Erik Magnusson, singer/dance band artist (Sven-Ingvars)
Christer Sjögren, rock/dansband singer (Vikingarna)
Ulf Sterner, ice hockey player (first Swede to play in the National Hockey League)
Fabian Zetterlund, ice hockey forward (forward for the New Jersey Devils)
Elgen Helge, local hero (Most handsome moose around)

Sites of interest

Alsters herrgård, the manor house where Gustaf Fröding was born
Karlstad Church, built in 1730
An indoor ice rink and event arena, Löfbergs Arena, expanded in 2002 to host the Ice Hockey World Championships
Botanical gardens
The masonic lodge where the negotiations for the dissolution of the union between Sweden and Norway were held in 1905
A runestone Vr 2, one of four known in Värmland
A history museum
A nature museum

International relations

Twin towns – sister cities
The municipality is twinned with:

 Blönduós, Iceland
 Gaziantep, Turkey
 Horsens, Denmark
 Jõgeva, Estonia

 Moss, Norway
 Nokia, Finland

See also
Da Buzz
Swedish Rescue Services Agency
Swedish Rally
Klarälven
Karlstad Hundred
Färjestads BK

References

External links

Karlstad Municipality – Official site
Karlstad University

 
Municipalities of Värmland County
iu:ᑲᕐᓪᔅᑕᑦ